John Lawson (June 16, 1837 – May 3, 1919) was a United States Navy sailor who received the Medal of Honor for his actions during the American Civil War.

Biography
John Lawson was born June 16, 1837. in Philadelphia, Pennsylvania. He enlisted the Navy from New York in December 1863. On August 5, 1864 during the Battle of Mobile Bay, while serving in a member of 's berth deck ammunition party, he was seriously wounded after a shell had wounded him in the leg and killed or wounded the rest of his crew. Despite his wounds, he remained at his post and continued to supply the Hartford 's guns. John Lawson was one of twelve men who received the Medal of Honor for heroism that day.

After leaving the Navy in July 1865, he returned to the Philadelphia area, where he raised a large family and earned his living as a huckster. He died in Philadelphia on May 3, 1919 and was buried in Mount Peace Cemetery, Lawnside, New Jersey. He was 81.

Over time, the tombstone which marked his grave subsided, fell, or was worn to the point that it became unreadable; additionally a fire at the cemetery offices destroyed burial records and the cemetery map, and his exact resting place is not known. On April 24, 2004 a new tombstone was dedicated to John Lawson's honor and placed among at least 72 other Civil War veterans who are buried at Mount Peace. On April 24, 2004, the headstone was dedicated at a ceremony attended by veteran's groups, politicians, several of Lawson's descendants, and local community members.

Medal of Honor citation
Rank and organization: Landsman, U.S. Navy. Born: 1837, Pennsylvania. Accredited to: Pennsylvania. G.O. No.: 45, December 31, 1864.

Citation:

On board the flagship U.S.S. Hartford during successful attacks against Fort Morgan, rebel gunboats and the ram Tennessee in Mobile Bay on 5 August 1864. Wounded in the leg and thrown violently against the side of the ship when an enemy shell killed or wounded the 6-man crew as the shell whipped on the berth deck, Lawson, upon regaining his composure, promptly returned to his station and, although urged to go below for treatment, steadfastly continued his duties throughout the remainder of the action.

See also

List of American Civil War Medal of Honor recipients: G–L

References

1837 births
1919 deaths
United States Navy Medal of Honor recipients
Union Navy sailors
Military personnel from Philadelphia
American Civil War recipients of the Medal of Honor
People of Pennsylvania in the American Civil War